Searchmont is a community with a local services board in the Canadian province of Ontario. The services board covers the unincorporated townships of Deroche, Gaudette, Hodgins and Shields in the Algoma District northeast of Sault Ste. Marie. It includes the communities of Searchmont, Wabos, Northland and Glendale.

The area is best known for the ski resort of the same name located within the community.

The town of Searchmont received its name in honor of T. C. Search, the treasurer of the consolidated Lake Superior Company. Searchmont was once a bustling community built around the forestry industry. The local sawmill was the livelihood of most of the residents. When the mill closed in the early 1990s, much of the population moved away.

The Searchmont Community Centre recently was renovated in 2002 with the aid of a SuperBuild grant provided by the Ontario government. Part of the newly renovated Searchmont Community Centre has been named after Walter Senko, a recently deceased school teacher in the area.

A designated place in Statistics Canada census data, Searchmont had a population of 300 in the Canada 2006 Census.

The town of Searchmont is serviced with respect to Fire Response and Emergency First Response services by the Searchmont Community Volunteer Fire Department.  The original Searchmont Fire Brigade was formed in 1976 with a grant of $15,000 from the Isolated Communities Assistance Fund along with $8,000 raised by the community. The brigade was able to purchase a pumper truck, 2 portable fire pumps, protection clothing and breathing apparatus at that time. The current SCVFD hosts an annual Fireman's Ball each spring as a local fundraiser and to provide an opportunity for the community to recognize the individual volunteer efforts provided.

Demographics 

References

Te

Communities in Algoma District
Local services boards in Ontario
Designated places in Ontario